Sphegina nigrapicula is a species of hoverfly in the family Syrphidae.

Distribution
China.

References

Eristalinae
Insects described in 2007
Diptera of Asia